A Few Good Men is a 1992 American legal drama film based on Aaron Sorkin's 1989 play. It was written by Sorkin, directed by Rob Reiner, and produced by Reiner, David Brown and Andrew Scheinman. It stars an ensemble cast including Tom Cruise, Jack Nicholson, Demi Moore, Kevin Bacon, Kevin Pollak, J. T. Walsh, Cuba Gooding Jr., and Kiefer Sutherland. The plot follows the court-martial of two U.S. Marines charged with the murder of a fellow Marine and the tribulations of their lawyers as they prepare a case.

Produced by Castle Rock Entertainment, the film was released by Columbia Pictures on December 11, 1992, and premiered on December 9, 1992, at Westwood, Los Angeles. It received acclaim for its screenwriting, direction, themes, and acting, particularly that of Cruise, Nicholson, and Moore. It grossed more than $243 million on a budget of $40 million, and was nominated for four Academy Awards, including Best Picture.

Plot
At the Guantanamo Bay Naval Base in Cuba, Private William Santiago is a weak Marine, has poor relations with other Marines, and has broken the chain of command to ask to be transferred away. Lieutenant Colonel Matthew Markinson advocates for Santiago to be transferred, but Base Commander Colonel Nathan Jessep orders Santiago's platoon commander, Lieutenant Jonathan James Kendrick, to "train" Santiago. Santiago dies shortly afterward. Marines Lance Corporal Harold Dawson and Private First Class Louden Downey are accused of his murder and face a court-martial.

While Santiago was ostensibly killed in retaliation for alleging Dawson illegally fired his weapon into Cuban territory, United States Navy JAG Corps investigator and lawyer Lieutenant Commander Joanne Galloway suspects Dawson and Downey carried out a "code red" order: a violent extrajudicial punishment. Galloway wants to defend them, but the case is given to Lieutenant Daniel Kaffee, a callow lawyer with a penchant for plea bargains. Galloway is bothered by Kaffee's blasé approach, and Kaffee resents Galloway's interference.

Kaffee and Galloway question Jessep and others at Guantanamo Bay. Jessep claims Santiago was to be transferred the next day. When Kaffee negotiates a plea bargain with the prosecutor, US Marine JAG Corps Captain Jack Ross, Dawson and Downey refuse, insisting that Kendrick gave them the "code red" order and that they never intended to kill Santiago. Dawson believes that it is dishonorable to pursue a plea bargain rather than defend their actions at trial. Kaffee intends to get removed as counsel as he thinks the trial is pointless. At the arraignment, Kaffee unexpectedly enters a plea of not guilty for the defendants. He tells Galloway that he was chosen to handle the case because he was expected to accept a plea, and the matter would then be kept quiet.

Markinson meets Kaffee in secret and says that Jessep never ordered a transfer for Santiago. The defense establishes that Dawson had been denied promotion for smuggling food to a Marine who had been sentenced to be deprived of food. Dawson is portrayed in a good light and the defense, through Downey, proves that "code reds" had been ordered before. But under cross-examination, Downey says that he was not present when Dawson received the supposed "code red" order. Markinson, ashamed that he failed to protect a Marine under his command, commits suicide before he can testify.

Without Markinson's testimony, Kaffee believes the case lost. He returns home in a drunken stupor, lamenting that he fought the case instead of taking a deal. Galloway encourages Kaffee to call Jessep as a witness, despite the risk of being court-martialed for challenging a high-ranking officer.

At the Washington Navy Yard court, Jessep spars under Kaffee's questioning, but is unnerved when Kaffee points out a contradiction in his testimony: Jessep said that his Marines never disobey orders and that Santiago was to be transferred for his own safety. Kaffee asks why Santiago was in danger if Jessep had ordered his men to leave him alone. Disgusted by Kaffee's attitude, Jessep extols the military's importance, and his own, to national security. Finally, he bellows with contempt that he ordered the "code red." Jessep tries to leave the courtroom but is arrested.

Dawson and Downey are cleared of the murder and conspiracy charges, but found guilty of "conduct unbecoming" and will be dishonorably discharged. Downey does not understand what they did wrong; Dawson says that they failed to defend those too weak to fight for themselves, such as Santiago. Kaffee tells Dawson that he does not need to wear a patch on his arm to have honor. Dawson acknowledges Kaffee as an officer, and renders a salute. Kaffee and Ross exchange kudos before Ross departs to arrest Kendrick.

Cast

 Tom Cruise as Lieutenant (junior grade) Daniel Kaffee, USN, JAG Corps
 Jack Nicholson as Colonel Nathan R. Jessep, USMC
 Demi Moore as Lieutenant Commander Joanne Galloway, USN, JAG Corps
 Kevin Bacon as Captain Jack Ross, USMC, Judge Advocate Division
 Kiefer Sutherland as First Lieutenant Jonathan James Kendrick, USMC
 Kevin Pollak as Lieutenant (junior grade) Sam Weinberg, USN, JAG Corps
 Wolfgang Bodison as Lance Corporal Harold W. Dawson, USMC
 James Marshall as Private First Class Louden Downey, USMC
 J. T. Walsh as Lieutenant Colonel Matthew Andrew Markinson, USMC
 J. A. Preston as Judge (Colonel) Julius Alexander Randolph, USMC
 Michael DeLorenzo as Private First Class William Santiago, USMC
 Noah Wyle as Corporal Jeffrey Owen Barnes, USMC
 Cuba Gooding Jr. as Corporal Carl Edward Hammaker, USMC
 Xander Berkeley as Captain Whitaker, USN
 Matt Craven as Lieutenant Dave Spradling, USN, JAG Corps
 John M. Jackson as Captain West, USN, JAG Corps
 Christopher Guest as Commander (Dr.) Stone, USN, MC
 David Bowe as Commander Gibbs, USN JAG Corps
 Joshua Malina as Tom, Jessep's clerk
 Harry Caesar as newspaper stand operator Luther
 Arthur Senzy as Robert C. McGuire, Special Agent - NIS

Production
Screenwriter Aaron Sorkin was inspired to write the source play, A Few Good Men, from a phone conversation with his sister Deborah. A graduate of Boston University Law School, she had signed up for a three-year stint with the U.S. Navy Judge Advocate General's Corps. She said that she was going to Guantanamo Bay to defend a group of Marines who had nearly killed a fellow Marine in a hazing ordered by a superior officer.

Sorkin wrote much of his story on cocktail napkins while bartending at the Palace Theatre on Broadway. He and his roommates had purchased a Macintosh 512K; when he returned home, he would empty his pockets of the napkins and type them into the computer, forming a basis from which he wrote many drafts.

In 1988, Sorkin sold his play's film rights to producer David Brown before it premiered, in a deal reportedly "well into six figures". Brown had read a New York Times article about Sorkin's one-act play Hidden in This Picture, and he learned that Sorkin also had a play called A Few Good Men that was having off-Broadway readings. Brown was producing a few projects at TriStar Pictures, and tried to interest them in adapting A Few Good Men, but his proposal was declined due to the lack of star actors. In 1990, Variety announced that the film would be financed by Groupe Canal+ and Brown's company World Film Services. Brown received a call from Alan Horn at Castle Rock Entertainment, who was anxious to make the film. Rob Reiner, a producing partner at Castle Rock, opted to direct.

Reiner and Sorkin spent eight months writing the screenplay. William Goldman did an uncredited rewrite; Sorkin liked his changes so much that he incorporated them into the stage version. One of the most significant changes was the removal of a forged logbook that served as the trial's "smoking gun" in the play.

The film had a production budget of between $33 and 40 million. Tom Cruise was cast as Kaffee on March 22, 1991, and was given a $12.5 million salary. Demi Moore was cast as Galloway. Wolfgang Bodison was a film location scout when he was asked to take part in a screen test for the part of Dawson. James Woods auditioned to play Jessep, but Jack Nicholson was cast. Nicholson was paid $5 million for 10 days of shooting, earning $500,000 a day. Nicholson said, "it was one of the few times when it was money well spent." He later criticized Columbia Pictures for moving the film's release date to directly compete with his other film that year, Hoffa.

The film starts with a performance of "Semper Fidelis" by a U.S. Marine Corps marching band. A Silent Drill was performed by the Texas A&M University Corps of Cadets Fish Drill Team (portraying the United States Marine Corps Silent Drill Platoon).

Commentators have suggested several former Navy JAG lawyers who might have been the model for Kaffee. These include Don Marcari, now an attorney in Virginia; former U.S. Attorney David Iglesias; Chris Johnson, now practicing in California; and Walter Bansley III, now practicing in Connecticut. But Sorkin has said, "The character of Dan Kaffee in A Few Good Men is entirely fictional and was not inspired by any particular individual."

Cruise said that he modeled his performance on Church of Scientology chairman David Miscavige, with whom he is friends. Cruise insisted on using the church's Clearsound sound reproduction technology, which he claimed captured his voice better.

Filming began on October 21, 1991, at the Arlington Memorial Bridge in Washington D.C. The film's Guantanamo Bay scenes were filmed in Southern California at Crystal Cove State Park, Fort MacArthur, and Naval Air Station Point Mugu. Although 200 off-duty Marines were allowed to serve as extras for the film, the U.S. Department of Defense denied the production permission to film at Marine Corps Base Camp Pendleton. The courtroom scenes were filmed at Culver Studios in Culver City, California.

Reception

Box office
A Few Good Men premiered at the Odeon Cinema, Manchester, England, and opened on December 11, 1992, in 1,925 theaters. It grossed $15,517,468 in its opening weekend and was the top film at the box office for the next three weeks. Overall, it grossed $141,340,178 in the U.S. and $101,900,000 internationally for a total of $243,240,178.

Critical response
On Rotten Tomatoes, A Few Good Men has an approval rating of 84% based on 67 reviews, with an average rating of 7.10/10. The site's critical consensus reads, "An old-fashioned courtroom drama with a contemporary edge, A Few Good Men succeeds on the strength of its stars, with Tom Cruise, Demi Moore, and especially Jack Nicholson delivering powerful performances that more than compensate for the predictable plot." On Metacritic the film has a score of 62 out of 100, based on 21 critics, indicating "generally favorable reviews". Audiences polled by CinemaScore gave the film an average grade of "A+" on an A+ to F scale, one of fewer than 60 films in the history of the service to earn that grade.

Peter Travers of Rolling Stone said, "That the performances are uniformly outstanding is a tribute to Rob Reiner (Misery), who directs with masterly assurance, fusing suspense and character to create a movie that literally vibrates with energy." Richard Schickel in Time called it "an extraordinarily well-made movie, which wastes no words or images in telling a conventional but compelling story." Todd McCarthy in Variety magazine predicted, "The same histrionic fireworks that gripped theater audiences will prove even more compelling to filmgoers due to the star power and dramatic screw-tightening." Roger Ebert was less enthusiastic in the Chicago Sun-Times, giving it two-and-a-half out of four stars and finding its major flaw was revealing the courtroom strategy to the audience before the climactic scene between Cruise and Nicholson. Ebert wrote, "In many ways this is a good film, with the potential to be even better than that. The flaws are mostly at the screenplay level; the film doesn't make us work, doesn't allow us to figure out things for ourselves, is afraid we'll miss things if they're not spelled out."

Widescreenings noted that for Kaffee, "Sorkin interestingly takes the opposite approach of Top Gun", in which Cruise also played the protagonist. In Top Gun, Cruise plays Pete "Maverick" Mitchell, a "hotshot military underachiever who makes mistakes because he is trying to outperform his late father. Where Maverick needs to rein in the discipline, Daniel Kaffee needs to let it go, finally see what he can do." Sorkin and Reiner were praised in gradually unveiling Kaffee's potential in the film.

Awards and honors

Other honors
The film is recognized by American Film Institute in these lists:
 2003: AFI's 100 Years...100 Heroes & Villains:
 Colonel Nathan R. Jessep – Nominated Villain
 2005: AFI's 100 Years...100 Movie Quotes:
 Col. Nathan Jessep: "You can't handle the truth!" – #29
 2008: AFI's 10 Top 10:
 #5 Courtroom Drama Film

Home media
A Few Good Men was released on VHS and Laserdisc by Columbia TriStar Home Video on June 30, 1993, and released on DVD on October 7, 1997. The VHS was again released along with a DVD release on May 29, 2001, and later a Blu-Ray release followed on  September 8, 2007. The Double Feature of the film and Jerry Maguire was released on DVD on December 29, 2009, by Sony Pictures Home Entertainment. A 4K UHD Blu-Ray release occurred on April 24, 2018.

See also
 Trial movies

References

External links

 
 
 
 
 
 
 

1992 films
1992 drama films
1992 crime drama films
1990s English-language films
1990s legal drama films
American courtroom films
American crime drama films
American films based on plays
American legal drama films
Castle Rock Entertainment films
Columbia Pictures films
Films about lawyers
Films about the United States Marine Corps
Films about the United States Navy
Films directed by Rob Reiner
Films produced by David Brown
Films scored by Marc Shaiman
Films set in Cuba
Films set in Washington, D.C.
Films shot in Los Angeles County, California
Films shot in Ventura County, California
Films shot in Washington, D.C.
Films with screenplays by Aaron Sorkin
Guantanamo Bay Naval Base
Legal thriller films
Military courtroom films
1990s American films